Spencer Cowper (23 February 1670 – 10 December 1728) was an English lawyer and politician who sat in the English and British House of Commons between 1705 and 1727.

Early life
Cowper was the second son of Sir William Cowper, 2nd Baronet of Hertford, and his wife, Lady Sarah Cowper, the diarist, and daughter of Samuel Holled, a London merchant. He was educated at Westminster School, called to the bar in 1693. In 1690 he was made controller of the Bridge House Estates with a residence at the Bridge House, near St Olave's Church close to what is now Tooley Street Southwark.

The Sarah Stout Affair
Cowper served on the Home circuit, and was acquainted with a Quaker family called Stout in Hertford, who had supported his father and brother during elections in the area. The Stout's daughter Sarah fell in love with him, even though he was already married to Pennington Goodere.

One evening at the Spring assizes in March 1699, Cowper went to Sarah's home to pay her the interest on a mortgage. He returned home and the next morning Sarah was found dead in the river. The prosecution asserted that because the body was floating when found, that it must have been put in the water after death. To challenge this idea, evidence was given by the famous physicians Samuel Garth and Hans Sloane. It appears that there was no other evidence to support the charge. The defendants were acquitted.

At the time different allegations were made concerning the affair, including the one that the Tories of Hertford wanted to hang a member of a prominent Whig family and another that the Quakers wanted to clear themselves from the stigma of suicide. Pamphlets were published on both sides, and there was an unsuccessful attempt to reignite the case.

Career
Cowper subsequently represented Bere Alston in 1705 and was re-elected at the 1708 election. He was one of the managers of the impeachment of Henry Sacheverell, but lost his seat, in 1710, in the reaction that followed. In 1714, he became attorney-general to the Prince of Wales.

Cowper was elected MP for Truro in 1715. In 1717 he was appointed chief justice of Chester. With the accession of George II in 1727, Cowper was made attorney-general to the duchy of Lancaster, and then in 1727 a judge  of the common pleas.

Cowper died on 10 December 1728 and was buried at the family seat Hertingfordbury where a monument to him by Louis-François Roubiliac was erected.

Family
His first wife Pennington died in November 1727.

Spencer married his second wife Theodora, the widow of John Stepney MP, shortly before his death in 1728. Theodora commissioned Roubiliac to erect her husband's monument. 

Cowper's eldest son William Cowper was clerk of parliament and the father of General William Cowper of Hertingfordbury Park (MP). He died on 14 February 1740. His second son, John, was the father of William Cowper the poet. His third son Ashley was also clerk of parliament and a barrister, and the father of Theodora Cowper (with whom the poet fell in love) and Harriot Cowper (Lady Hesketh). He died in 1788. Cowper's only daughter was Judith Madan, a poet. She married Colonel Martin Madan (MP), Groom of the Chamber to Frederick, Prince of Wales, and M.P. for Wootton Bassett.

References

Attribution

1670 births
1728 deaths
People from East Hertfordshire District
English MPs 1705–1707
Members of the Parliament of Great Britain for Bere Alston
Members of the Parliament of Great Britain for Truro
British MPs 1707–1708
British MPs 1708–1710
British MPs 1715–1722
British MPs 1722–1727
Younger sons of baronets
Justices of the Common Pleas
Members of the Parliament of England for Bere Alston